The Ogden Military Academy was a private boarding school and military academy that operated in Ogden, Utah from 1889 to 1896.

History
The academy was opened on October 1, 1889 with 70 resident students and 50 cadets. The annual fee of $750 covered tuition, room and board. Some of the academic courses at the school were instructed by United States Army officers.

In 1896, the Utah State Industrial School (later renamed Youth Development Center) took over the site until 1984, when the Ogden–Weber Technical College (formerly  known last the Ogden–Weber Applied Technology College) moved its campus to this location. The collected records of the academy from September 1890 to 1893 were transferred from the archives of Brigham Young University to the Stewart Library at Weber State University.

Notable cadets
Frederick C. Loofbourow - U.S. Representative from Utah

See also
List of defunct United States military academies

References

External links
Map of Ogden Military Academy at J. Willard Marriott Library, University of Utah
Picture of Ogden Military Academy Circa 1896

Boarding schools in Utah
Defunct schools in Utah
Educational institutions established in 1889
Educational institutions disestablished in 1896
Military high schools in the United States
Buildings and structures in Ogden, Utah
Schools in Weber County, Utah
1889 establishments in Utah Territory